Ezequiel "Equi" González (born 10 July 1980 in Rosario) is a former Argentine midfielder.

Career
González started playing professionally at home-based first division Rosario Central in 1997. His success in the club from Rosario (Santa Fé) took him to Fiorentina, a young man in a club facing bankruptcy made things hard for him to settle in Italy, his raw talent was there for all to see it was just the wrong time to be at the club. Early in 2002 El Equi returned to Argentina to play for Boca Juniors, and then a year later he joined his first club, Rosario Central. After half a season (a short championship in Argentina), Ezequiel moved to Panathinaikos, where he was loved by fans of Panathinaikos, becoming captain of the team, and helping the club to win its first championship in 7 years in 2004. That year he also won the Greek Cup with Panathinaikos completing the Double.

Equi González had great technique, creative passing and high influence. His first UEFA Champions League appearance (September 2004) was more than successful, as he scored two fantastic goals against Norwegian champions Rosenborg.

Unfortunately, Gonzalez picked up a cruciate ligament injury during a friendly match (Panathinaikos vs. Apollon Athinon (1-0)). Due to this injury, he played only one match during the 2006–2007 season. Equi returned from his injury, against Apollon Kalamarias (1-0) on January 6, 2008.

On June 27, 2008, he went back to Rosario Central. Wearing the number 10 he had a good season. At the end of the season he moved to Fluminense on a free transfer to play in the Brazilian League. In 2011 he chose to play for LDU Quito in Ecuador. At the end of his contract he retired.

Honours
Boca Juniors
Copa Libertadores: 2003

Panathinaikos
Super League Greece: 2003–04
Greek Cup: 2003–04

References

External links
Statistics at Guardian Stats Centre
 Argentine Primera statistics
 at Footballdatabase
Profile at WorldSoccer
Fan Club
zerzerofootball.com 

1980 births
Living people
Footballers from Rosario, Santa Fe
Argentine footballers
Rosario Central footballers
Boca Juniors footballers
ACF Fiorentina players
Panathinaikos F.C. players
Fluminense FC players
L.D.U. Quito footballers
Argentine Primera División players
Serie A players
Super League Greece players
Campeonato Brasileiro Série A players
Ecuadorian Serie A players
Argentine expatriate footballers
Expatriate footballers in Italy
Expatriate footballers in Greece
Expatriate footballers in Brazil
Expatriate footballers in Ecuador
Argentine expatriate sportspeople in Brazil
Argentine expatriate sportspeople in Greece
Argentine expatriate sportspeople in Italy
Panathinaikos F.C. non-playing staff
Association football midfielders